The Men's madison event of the 2009 UCI Track Cycling World Championships was held on 28 March 2009.

Results

References

Men's madison
UCI Track Cycling World Championships – Men's madison